Aspidelaps lubricus, commonly known as the Cape coral snake or the Cape coral cobra, is a species of venomous snake in the family Elapidae. The species is endemic to southern Africa.

Geographic range and habitat
A. lubricus is found in regions of the Karoo, former Cape Province, and all the way up into Namibia.  It mostly inhabits very arid regions, like deserts and rocky/sandy ecosystems.  These areas within South Africa within the Karoo are known for low predictable rainfall and little vegetation, mostly shrubs and scrubs.

Taxonomy

Etymology
The subspecific name, cowlesi, is in honor of African-born American herpetologist Raymond Bridgman Cowles.

Description
The Cape coral snake is a small elapid, which means that it is a part of a family of venomous snakes that are usually found within tropical or sub-tropical regions around the globe. It has an enlarged rostral scale, which is the scale located at the front of the snout above the mouth opening on the snake. The head relative to the body is very short, making it very easy to distinguish it from the neck and rest of the snake. Colors range from red-orange to yellow, slightly resembling the coloration patterns seen on some corn snakes. The Cape coral snake has thick black rings along the length of the body, fully encircling on the body while not fully on the tail segment. There are around 20–47 total rings spanning the length of the snakes body. This species also contains a narrow hood right below the head, much like other cobras.

Behaviour
A. lubricus is nocturnal, which means most of its activity and hunting occurs during the night. Since it generally prefers arid, rocky/sandy ecosystems, it will often be found living under rocks or even in burrows and tunnels. It has also been known to prefer leaving its burrow or hiding spots on cooler nights compared to the warmer nights in the summer.

Diet
Since A. lubricus is nocturnal, it relies on smell and taste to hunt its prey. It typically leaves its burrow or hole in search of smaller vertebrates nearby. It preys specifically on lizards, but has also been known to hunt other vertebrates such as legless skinks, small rodents, and sometimes other snakes. It is also known to target those vertebrates which are strictly diurnal, which are sleeping when it is on the hunt. This snake is known to rear up towards prey or when threatened, and then strike, injecting its venom. In captivity, it is known to eat some types of fish, mice, small rats, and also chicken legs, which are preferred by the juveniles.

Reproduction and life cycles
Not much information was found on A. lubricus in the wild, however there is reproduction data from captivity. In captivity, it is known to be exceptionally easy to breed. The breeding period starts in the winter, with the cooling down of winter temperatures. The snakes then increase their uptake of food to help cope with the extra energy needed to reproduce. If mating occurs at this time, the eggs will usually be laid in May or June. After that, there is a period of about 65 days before the eggs begin to hatch. There are usually between 3 and 11 eggs hatched per clutch, with sometimes multiple clutches per breeding period. Each hatchling can be around 17–18 cm (6.7–7.1 inches) in total length.

Venom
Although A. lubricus has been kept in captivity, there is still little known information on the venom itself. There has been no information given about the toxicity or the composition of the venom. However, the venom has been noted as similar to that of the genus Naja, which contains all of the species of snakes known as true cobras. When venom has been taken in captivity, it yields around 27–71 mg of wet venom. The average yield is around 55 mg and is about 28% solid material. Previous studies have shown that in rats, this snake's venom caused neurological symptoms, which escalated into respiratory failure and eventually death.

Human fatalities have been recorded from bites by A. lubricus.

Recently, a 44-year-old man was bitten twice by this species, which was kept in captivity, one hour after the bite he developed vomiting, respiratory failure (requiring mechanical ventilation), paralysis of the bulbar muscles and upper limbs, with retention of the voluntary motor control in the lower limbs. After treatment, paralysis and respiratory failure resolved in 12 hours. No antivenom is currently available for this species.

Conservation status
As of 2015, the Cape coral snake is not listed as threatened or in need of conservation efforts. The main threat that is listed for this species is when crossing roads and highways, where vehicles can run over them.

References

Further reading
Branch, Bill (2004). Field Guide to Snakes and other Reptiles of Southern Africa. Third Revised edition, Second impression. Sanibel Island, Florida: Ralph Curtis Books. 399 pp., 112 color plates. . (Aspidelaps lubricus, pp. 103–104 + Plates 20 & 26).
Laurenti JN (1768). Specimen medicum, exhibens synopsin reptilium emendatam cum experimentis circa venena et antidota reptilium austriacorum. Vienna: Joan. Thom. Nob. de Trattnern. 214 pp. + Plates I-V. (Natrix lubrica, new species, p. 80). (in Latin).

External links

lubricus
Snakes of Africa
Reptiles described in 1768
Taxa named by Josephus Nicolaus Laurenti